Hongkun Park (born 1967 in Seoul) is Mark Hyman Jr. Professor of Chemistry and Professor of Physics at Harvard University. He received his BS in chemistry at Seoul National University in 1990, and his PhD in physical chemistry at Stanford University in 1996 under Richard Zare. From 1996 to 1999 he was a postdoctoral fellow at Lawrence Berkeley National Laboratory under A. Paul Alivisatos and Paul McEuen.

His current research focuses on optoelectronics and plasmonics using nanostructures, nano-bio interfacing, and neuro-electronic devices.

Work
Professional appointments 
1999–2002 Assistant Professor of Chemistry, Harvard University
2003. 1	Associate Professor of Chemistry, Harvard University
2003. 7	John L. Loeb Associate Professor of the Natural Sciences, Harvard University
2004. 1	Full Professor of Chemistry and of Physics, Harvard University
Affiliations 
Professor of Chemistry and of Physics, Harvard University
Associate Member, Broad Institute
Affiliated Faculty, Harvard Center for Brain Science
Affiliated Faculty, Harvard Stem Cell Institute
Affiliated Faculty: Harvard Quantum Optics Center
Professional Board 
Associate editor, Nano Letters
Advisory Editorial Board, Chemical Science
Advisory Editorial Board, Chemical Society Reviews
Advisory Board, Harvard Quantum Optics Center
Academic Training 
1986 – 1990	B.S. in chemistry, Seoul National University, Seoul Korea
1991 – 1996	PhD in physical chemistry, Stanford University (Advisor: Richard N. Zare)
1996 – 1999	Postdoctoral fellow, Lawrence Berkeley National Laboratory (with A. Paul Alivisatos and Paul L. McEuen)

Academic and professional awards
2016 DoD Vannevar Bush Faculty Fellowship
2011 Fellow, American Association for the Advancement of Science
2008 National Institutes of Health Director's Pioneer Award
2003	Camille and Henry Dreyfus Teacher-Scholar Award
2003	Ho-Am Prize in science
2003	Visiting Miller Research Professorship, The Adolph C. and Mary Sprague Miller Institute for Basic Research in Science, University of California, Berkeley
2002	Alfred P. Sloan Foundation Research Fellowship
2001	David and Lucile Packard Foundation Fellowship for Science and Engineering
2001	National Science Foundation CAREER Award
1999	Camille and Henry Dreyfus New Faculty Award
1999	Research Innovation Award from the Research Corporation

Representative publications
"Nanomechanical oscillations in a single-C60 transistor", H. Park, J. Park, A. K. L. Lim, E. H. Anderson, A. P. A livisatos, and P. L. McEuen, Nature 407, 57–60 (2000)
"Fabry-Perot interference in a nanotube electron waveguide", W. Liang, M. Bockrath, D. Bozovic, J. H. Hafner, M. Tinkham, and H. Park, Nature 411, 665–669 (2001)
"Nanowire nanosensors for highly sensitive and selective detection of biological and chemical species", Y. Cui, Q. Wei, H. Park, and C. M. Lieber, Science 293, 1289–1292 (2001)
"Resonant electron scattering by defects in single-walled carbon nanotubes", M. Bockrath, W. Liang, D. Bozovic, J. H. Hafner, C. M. Lieber, M. Tinkham, and H. Park, Science 291, 283–285 (2001)
"Kondo resonance in a single-molecule transistor", W. Liang, M. P. Shores, M. Bockrath, J. R. Long, and H. Park, Nature 417, 725–729 (2002)
"Single-walled carbon nanotube electronics", P. L. McEuen, M. Fuhrer, and H. Park, IEEE Trans. Nanotech. 1, 78–85 (2002)
"Shell filling and exchange coupling in metallic single-walled carbon nanotubes", W. Liang, M. Bockrath, and H. Park, Phys. Rev. Lett. 88, 126801 (2002)
"Synthesis of single-crystalline perovskite nanowires composed of barium titanate and strontium titanate", J. J. Urban, W. S. Yun, Q. Gu, and H. Park, J. Am. Chem. Soc. 124, 1186–1187 (2002)
"Ferroelectric phase transitions in individual single-crystalline BaTiO3 nanowrires", J. E. Spanier, A. M. Kolpak, J. J. Urban, I. Grinberg, W. S. Yun, L. Ouyang, A. M. Rappe and H. Park, Nano Lett. 6, 735 – 739 (2006)
"Generation of single optical plasmons in metallic nanowires coupled to quantum dots", A. V. Akimov, A. Mukherjee, C. L. Yu, D. E. Chang, A. S. Zibrov, P. R. Hemmer, H. Park and M. D. Lukin, Nature 450, 402–406 (2007)
"Near field electrical detection of optical plasmons and single plasmon sources", A. L. Falk, F. H. L. Koppens, C. Yu, K. Kang, N. P. de Leon Snapp, A. V. Akimov, M-H. Jo, M. D. Lukin, H. Park, Nature Phys. 5, 475–479 (2009)
"Vertical silicon nanowires as a universal platform for delivering biomolecules into living cells", A. Shalek, J. T. Robinson, E. S. Karp, J. S. Lee, D-R. Ahn, M-H. Yoon, A. Sutton, M. Jorgolli, R. S. Gertner, T. S. Gujral, G. MacBeath, E. G. Yang, H. Park, Proc. Natl. Acad. Sci. USA 107, 1870–1875 (2010)
"Vertical nanowire electrode arrays as a scalable platform for intracellular interfacing to neuronal circuits", J. T. Robinson, M. Jorgolli, A. K. Shalek, M.-H. Yoon, R. S. Gertner, H. Park, Nature Nanotech. 7, 180–184 (2012)
"Single-cell transcriptomics reveals bimodality in expression and splicing in immune cells," A. K. Shalek, R. Satija, X. Adiconis, R. S. Gertner, J. T. Gaublomme, R. Raychowdhury, S. Schwartz, N. Yosef, C. Malboeuf, A. Gnirke, A. Goren, N. Hacohen, J. Z. Levin, H. Park, A. Regev Nature 498, 236-240 (2013)
"Dynamic regulatory network controlling Th17 cell differentiation", N. Yosef, A. K. Shalek, J. T. Gaublomme, H. Jin, Y. Lee, A Awasthi, C. Wu, K. Karwacz, S. Xiao, M. Jorgolli, D. Gennert, R. Satija, A. Shakya, D. Y. Lu, J. T. Trombetta, M. Pillai, P. J. Ratcliffe, M. L. Coleman, M. Bix, D. Tantin, H. Park, V. K. Kuchroo, A. Regev, Nature 496, 461-468 (2013)
"Nanometer-scale thermometry in a living cell," G. Kucsko, P. C. Maurer, N. Y. Yao, M. Kubo, H. J. Noh, P. K. Lo, H. Park, M. D. Lukin Nature 500, 54-59 (2013)
"Magnetic resonance detection of individual proton spins using quantum reporters," A. O. Sushkov, I. Lovchinsky, N. Chisholm, R. L. Walsworth, H. Park, M. D. Lukin Phys. Rev. Lett. 113, 197601 (2014)
"Visible-frequency hyperbolic metasurface," A. A. High, R. C. Devlin, A. Dibos, M. Polking, D. S. Wild, J. Perczel, N. P. de Leon, M. D. Lukin, H. Park Nature 522, 192-196 (2015)
"Single-cell genomics unveils critical regulators of Th17 cell pathogenicity," J. T. Gaublomme, N. Yosef, Y. Lee, R. S. Gertner, L. V. Yang, P. P. Pandolfi, T. Mak, R. Satija, A. K. Shalek, V. K. Kuchroo, H. Park, A. Regev Cell 163, 1400-1412 (2015)
"Magnetic resonance spectroscopy of an atomically thin material using a single-spin qubit," I. Lovchinsky, J. D. Sanchez-Yamagishi, E. Urbach, S. Choi, S. Fang, T. Andersen, K. Watanabe, T. Taniguchi, A. Bylinskii, E. Kaxiras, P. Kim, H. Park, M. D. Lukin Science 355, 503-507 (2017)
"CMOS nanoelectrode array for all-electrical intracellular electrophysiological imaging," J. Abbott, T. Ye, L. Qin, M. Jorgolli, R. S. Gertner, D. Ham, H. Park Nature Nanotech. 12, 460-466 (2017)
"Probing dark excitons in atomically thin semiconductors via near-field coupling to surface plasmon polaritons," Y. Zhou, G. Scuri, D. Wild, A. High, A. Dibos, L. Jauregui, C. Shu, K. de Greve, K. Pistunova, A. Joe, T. Taniguchi, K. Watanabe, P. Kim, M. D. Lukin, H. Park Nature Nanotech. 12, 856-860 (2017)

External links
 Park Lab Homepage at Harvard University
 Article discussing Park's neurobiology work
 Hongkun Park named a 2008 NIH Director's Pioneer Award recipient

1967 births
Living people
Harvard University faculty
Seoul National University alumni
South Korean scientists
South Korean physicists
Stanford University alumni
Recipients of the Ho-Am Prize in Science